Westmann may refer to

People
Stephan Westmann (1893–1964), German doctor who settled in England 
Alexander Westmann (1848–1923), Russian diplomat
Editha Westmann (born 1963), German politician 
Wilhelm Westmann (1813–1881), Austrian architect

Other
Westmann Isles, or Vestmannaeyjar, an archipelago of Iceland